Paschalis Draganidis (Greek: Πασχάλης Δραγανίδης, born 11 August 1992) is a Greek footballer, currently playing for Anagennisi Epanomi F.C. in Beta Ethniki.

Career

His professional career began in 2009 when he signed a contract with Panthrakikos.

Career statistics

Last update: 30 June 2010

References

External links
 Insports
 
 Panthraxstats

1992 births
Living people
Panthrakikos F.C. players
Association football midfielders
Greek footballers
Anagennisi Epanomi F.C. players
Footballers from Komotini